This is a list of television programmes broadcast by RTM TV2 Malaysia either currently broadcast, repeat broadcast and formerly broadcast on RTM TV2 Malaysia in Malaysia.

Saranghae On 2
 Triple (MBC)
 A Thousand Days' Promise (SBS)
 Ojakgyo Family (KBS)
 Bachelor's Vegetable Store (Channel A)
 Brain (KBS)
 Syndrome (JTBC)
 My Kids Give Me a Headache (JTBC)
 Love in Her Bag (JTBC)
 Spy Myung-wol (KBS)
 Discovery of Love (KBS)
 Tears of Heaven (MBN)
 Mask (SBS)
 Hyde Jekyll, Me (SBS)
 Temptation (SBS)
 My Unfortunate Boyfriend (MBC)
 Healer (KBS)
 Medical Top Team (MBC)
 Ex-Girlfriends' Club (tvN)
 My Horrible Boss (JTBC)
 I Remember You (KBS)
 Warm and Cozy (MBC)
 Man X Man (JTBC)
 My Secret Terrius (MBC)

Chinese Drama
 Dr. Qin Medical Examiner
 My Dream Home
 My Little Princess
 School Beauty's Personal Bodyguard
 The Imperial Doctress
 Detective Dee
 Can't Buy Me Love
 Sound of the Desert
Hui Jia De You Huo
 Young Sherlock
 Boss & Me
 My Sister of Eternal Flower
 Relic of an Emissary
 The Big Mistakes
 Golden Turbulence
 Love Me Tender
 Vengeance Code
 Moonlight Saigon
 Missing You
 Shadows of Love
 Life Without Regret
 Missing In Possibble

EN Drama
 S.W.A.T.
 NCIS (formerly aired on TV3 and 8TV)
 The River 
 Beauty And The Beast
 The Rookie (Coming Soon)
 SEAL Team (Coming Soon)
 Hudson & Rex
 9-1-1
 The X-Files (Season 10 and Season 11)
 Stalker
 Rookie Blue
 The Librarians
 MacGyver
 Make It Or Break It
 Supergirl
 Blue Bloods
 Humans
 Knight Rider
 Airwolf
 Hawaii Five-0
 Dexter
 Uncle Grandpa
 Drawn Together (formerly aired on NTV7 and TV9)
 Family Guy
 Robot Chicken (formerly aired on 8TV)
 South Park
 The Venture Bros.
 Criminal Minds (formerly aired on 8TV)
 The Simpsons

Entertainment & Variety Shows
 American Idol (formerly aired on 8TV)
 Penn & Teller: Fool Us
 The Brain USA Superhuman
 #HTV! (formerly aired on TV1)
 Face Off
 Running Man (TV series) (also aired on TV9) (formerly on NTV7) 
 Game Changers
 Kids Baking Championships
 The Great Australian Spelling Bee (All 2 seasons)
 M Countdown (formerly aired on 8TV)
 King of Mask Singer
 So You Think You Can Dance: The Next Generation
 WWE Bottom Line 2021 (11 October 2021) (Monday 12:00am
 WWE NXT 2021 (7 October 2021) (Thursday 12:00am
 WWE SmackDown
 WWE SmackDown 2020 (29 July 2020) (Wednesday 12:00am to 1:30am)
 WWE SmackDown 2021 (6 October 2021) (Wednesday 12:00am to 1:30am)
 WWE This Week
 WWE This Week 2020 (1 August 2020) (Saturday 12:30am to 1:30am)
 WWE This Week 2021 (10 October 2021) (Sunday 1:00am to 2:00am)
Junior Bake Off

Talk show On 2
 Fresh Brew (moved to Berita RTM and TV Okey, formerly Hello on Two)
 Vasantham (simulcast with Berita RTM and TV Okey)
 What Say You? (simulcast with Berita RTM and TV Okey)

News

Mandarin News
 RTM Mandarin News (Daily 12:00pm and 7:00pm on Berita RTM and TV2)

English News
 Updates@Noon (Daily 12:30pm on Berita RTM and TV2)
 News at Ten (Daily 10:00pm on Berita RTM and TV2)

Tamil News
 Tamil Seithigal (Daily 7:30pm on Berita RTM and TV2)

Toon On 2 
 Abus
 Abu & Aben
 Adi Genius
 A...Do B...Re C...Me
 Arnab Dan Kura Kura
 Asian Legends
Barbie Dreamhouse Adventures
 Beyblade Burst Evolution
 Beyblade Burst Turbo
 Beyblade Burst Rise
 Biskut Lemak
 Blaze and the Monster Machines (also on TV3)
 Boonie Bears
Boonie Bears: The Adventurers
 Budak Besi
 Budin oh Budin
 Captain Tsubasa
 Brandy & Mr. Whiskers
 Fillmore!
Cardfight Vanguard V Series
 Chellup
 Regular Show
 Cingkus Blues
Chop Chop Ninja
 CJ the DJ
 Cross Fight B-Daman
 Doplo Doplo
 Dunia Air Tawar
 Dunia Ddee
 Dino Rampage
 Dragon Lancer
 Ejen C
 Ejen 123
 Super Robot Monkey Team Hyperforce Go!
 Kim Possible
 The Proud Family
 The Grim Adventures Of Billy And Mandy
 Electro Boy
 Franklin and Friends
 Famous Dog Lassie
 Fruiterama
 Aqua Teen Hunger Force (Sponsored By Apollo)
 Go For Speed
Gormiti: The Supreme Eclipse Era
  Randy Cunningham
 Inspector Gadget
 Jaguh Silat
 Jake and the Never Land Pirates (formerly aired on NTV7)
 Kick Buttowski: Suburban Daredevil (English Version)
 Jack
 Jinggo
 Jing-Ju Cats (also aired on Astro Xiao Tai Yang)
 Kacang,
Kainar Asy-Tac Fronteer
 Kancil
 Kapluk Dari Kapluwi
 Kazoops!
 Ke Zoo
 Kiddo Science
 Konda Kondi
 Kuu Kuu Harajuku
 Katri, Girl of the Meadows
 Lilo Stitch
 Little Charmers
 Lost in Oz (also aired On TA-DAA!)
 Mac & Ted (also airs on TV Okey)
 Master Raindrop
 Matt
 Max & Maestro
 Megatik
 Mickey Mouse Clubhouse
 Rocket Monkeys
 Higglytown Heroes
 Boboiboy (also on TV3)
 The Amazing World Of Gumball 
 Mini Ninjas
 Mini Sains
Misi Ady
Motown Magic (coming soon)
 Nadim
 Ngat & Taboh
Noddy: Toyland Detective
 Pak Pandir Moden
 Paksi Adiwira
 Panda Warrior
 Pendekar Lima
 PJ Masks
 Planet Saga
 Polkadot
 Puteri Delima Sakti
 Raihan Rangers
 Ranggi
 Rat-a-Tat
 Rev-Evolution
Robin Hood
 Robo X
 Saga Atuk
 Satria 7 Pahlawan
 Soceer Bugs
 Sofia The First
 Space Racers
 Sugar Pals
 Sumo Mouse
 Supa Strikas
 Synostone (repeat from TV Okey)
 Tales of Tatonka
 Taman Laut
 Teen Titans (also aired on ntv7 & Awesome TV)
 The First
 The Tom & Jerry Show
Tom & Jerry
 Tomica Hero
 Transformers Animated
 Trolls: The Beat Goes On!
 Tulis
 Upin & Ipin (Season 10 - 11) (also airs on Astro Ceria and Astro Prima)
 Wakfu
 X-Men Evolution
 Zoo Kita

Live Action 
 Kids Go!
 ABC Hooray
 Kidzoners
 Chiki Boom
 Buzz
 Siapa Raime
 Putra
 Apit Dan Pendekar Legenda
 Wira Kasih
 Geng Penyiasat Sekolah
 Nine P.I.
 Chimie
 Ultraman Mebius
 Choushinsei Flashman
 Hikari Sentai Maksman
 Mirai Sentai Timeranger
 Hyakujuu Sentai Gaoranger
 GoGo Sentai Boukenger
 Engine Sentai Go-Onger
 Samurai Sentai Shinkenger
Tensou Sentai Goseiger
Power Rangers Super Megaforce
 Zyuden Sental Kyoryuger
 Power Rangers Dino Charge
 Garo The Makai No Hana & The Storm
 Garo The One Who Shines in the Darkness
 Soy Luna (Dubbed in Malay with English Subtitles) (Also airs on TV3, TV9 and NTV7)

2021 
 Dogengers (Malay Dub) (3 April) (evening & morning animation) – The edutainment series is sponsored by Ohga Pharmacy Japan, whose mascot "Ohgaman" is one of the series' main characters, through subsidiary Ohgaman Malaysia. It is originally aired in Japan to raise awareness about medicine wastage.

References

Programmes broadcast by TV2